The 1984 Liège–Bastogne–Liège was the 70th edition of the Liège–Bastogne–Liège cycle race and was held on 15 April 1984. The race started and finished in Liège. The race was won by Sean Kelly of the Skil team.

General classification

References

1984
1984 in Belgian sport
1984 Super Prestige Pernod International